Charles Silver (16 April 1868 – 10 October 1949) was a French composer.

Life 
Born in Paris, Silver studied at the Conservatoire de Paris with Théodore Dubois and Jules Massenet and won the Premier Grand Prix de Rome in 1891 with the lyrical drama L'Interdit. During his stay at the Villa Medici, he composed the opera La Belle au bois dormant in 1895, which was premiered in Marseille in 1902.

His most successful opera was La Mégère apprivoisée after Shakespeare's The Taming of the Shrew, which was on the repertoire of the Paris Opera for some time. He also composed a ballet, an oratorio and several symphonic works.

Silver taught harmony at the Conservatoire de Paris, where Amédée Borsari was one of his students. Since 1900 he was married to the singer Georgette Bréjean-Gravière.

Works 
 La Belle au bois dormant, Opera, 1902 in Marseille
 Tobia, Oratorium, 1902 in Marseille
 Poème carnwevalesque, 1906 in Monaco
 Le Clos, Myriane, Opera, 1913 in Nice
 Néigilde, Ballet, 1919 in Monte-Carlo
 La Mégère apprivoisée, Opera (libretto by Henri Caïn and Édouard Adenis)
 La Grand-Mère, Opera, 1930
 Quatre-Vingt-Treize, 1936 in Paris

Recordings
 aria from Myriane, Act III: Air. "Seul, ai-je dit" (Henri) Cyrille Dubois Orchestre National de Lille Pierre Dumoussaud Alpha 2023

References

External links 
 Biography on Musica et memoria

1868 births
1949 deaths
Musicians from Paris
Conservatoire de Paris alumni
Academic staff of the Conservatoire de Paris
French Romantic composers
20th-century French composers
French opera composers
French male classical composers
Prix de Rome for composition
Chevaliers of the Légion d'honneur
20th-century French male musicians
19th-century French male musicians